Hawke's Bay was a parliamentary electorate in the Hawke's Bay Region of New Zealand from 1881 to 1996. In 1986 it was renamed Hawkes Bay (without an apostrophe).

Population centres
The previous electoral redistribution was undertaken in 1875 for the 1875–1876 election. In the six years since, New Zealand's European population had increased by 65%. In the 1881 electoral redistribution, the House of Representatives increased the number of European representatives to 91 (up from 84 since the 1875–76 election). The number of Māori electorates was held at four. The House further decided that electorates should not have more than one representative, which led to 35 new electorates being formed, including Hawke's Bay, and two electorates that had previously been abolished to be recreated. This necessitated a major disruption to existing boundaries.

Prior to the 1881 electoral redistribution, the  electorate covered not just the town of Napier, but also its rural hinterland. The northern boundary was the 39th latitude, the arbitrary line established in 1853 that formed the boundary between the original Wellington and Auckland Provinces. In 1881, this arbitrary boundary line was abolished, and the  electorate came across this line to the south. Other settlements that belonged to the Hawke's Bay electorate in its initial shape were Bay View, Fernhill, and Havelock North.

History
The electorate was represented by twelve Members of Parliament:

The 1996 general election was held early, on 12 October, to avoid the need for a by-election after the resignation of Michael Laws.

Members of Parliament
Key

Election results

1943 election

1938 election

1935 election

1931 election

1928 election

1922 election

1919 election

1917 by-election

1893 election

1890 election

Notes

References

Historical electorates of New Zealand
Politics of the Hawke's Bay Region
1881 establishments in New Zealand
1996 disestablishments in New Zealand